Arshad Laeeq (born 28 November 1970), also sometimes known as Arshad Laiq is a former Pakistani-born cricketer who played for the United Arab Emirates national cricket team. He played two first-class cricket games for Pakistan Steel in 1986–87 and was a stand-by selection for Pakistan for the 1988 Youth World Cup. He also represented Pakistan at Under-19 level in a three-day match against India. He emigrated to the UAE in 1989, making his international debut in the ICC Trophy in 1993–94. He went on to play in the 1996 ICC Trophy too. Arshad Laeeq has played six One Day International, two in the Pepsi Austral-Asia Cup of 1993–94 in Sharjah, and then four in the 1996 Cricket World Cup. His brother Athar Laeeq and his uncle Saeed Azad were successful cricketer in domestic Pakistani cricket.

References

External links
 

1970 births
Living people
Emirati cricketers
United Arab Emirates One Day International cricketers
Pakistani emigrants to the United Arab Emirates
Pakistani expatriate sportspeople in the United Arab Emirates
Cricketers from Karachi
Pakistani cricketers